Arshad Madani (born 1941) is an Indian Muslim scholar and the current Principal of Darul Uloom Deoband. He succeeded Asad Madni as the eighth president of the Jamiat Ulama-e-Hind. The organization split around 2008, and Madani continues to serve as the president of its Arshad faction.

Career
Madani was appointed as the Principal of Darul Uloom Deoband on 14 October 2020.

Political approach 
Arshad Madani has criticized the partition of India and espoused Hindu–Muslim unity, stating: "Our elders from Hindu and Muslim communities went ahead on the path of unity and liberated the country from the slavery of the British, but unfortunately partition also took place. This partition has become a cause of destruction and ruin, not just for a particular community, but for both Hindus and Muslims." He suggests that secularism is the only path to a cohesive and united India.

He asserts that the current prime minister Narendra Modi is not acceptable to all Muslims of India. Muslim hostility to Modi is not softening recently at all as some circles in the Indian news media have suggested. He questions whether Indian Muslims can forgive Modi for his assertion that he initiated and condoned the 2002 Gujarat riots and the ensuing violence against Muslims in India, which Madani calls a mass murder of Muslims. Narendra Modi was the Chief Minister of Gujarat at that time.

References

Indian Sunni Muslims
Indian Islamic religious leaders
20th-century Muslim scholars of Islam
Deobandis
1941 births
Living people
People from Deoband
Academic staff of Darul Uloom Deoband
Presidents of Jamiat Ulama-e-Hind